Oko is a Russian missile defense system. Oko may also refer to:

Geography
Oko, Warmian-Masurian Voivodeship, a settlement in Poland
Oko-Akarè, an arrondissement in Benin
Oko River, a river in Guyana
Okoh Town, a town in Nigeria

Languages
Oko language, a Niger–Congo language
Oko-Juwoi language, an extinct, unrelated Great Andamanese language
Old Korean (ISO 639-3 code)
Oko is a word expressing expressive approval or assent in the French language in Canada.

People
Adolph S. Oko, Jr. (1904-1963), a ship captain who supported the establishment of Israel
Ataa Oko (1919–2012), a Ghanaian artist
Dorothy Kuhn Oko (1896–1971), librarian and labor unionist
Oko Jumbo (died 1891), a Nigerian traditional ruler
Seiji Oko (born 1948), a Japanese volleyball player

Science and technology
OKO (company) (Opytno KonstrooktOrskoye), a Kiev-based manufacturer of aircraft, such as the Tairov OKO-1, Tairov OKO-4, and Tairov OKO-7
Öko-Institut, a German research institute
US-K, also known as Oko, a satellite in the Oko system

Other uses
Oko (band), a Yugoslav rock band
OKO, a building complex in the Moscow International Business Center
OKO Tower, a skyscraper in the complex
OK Orchestra, an album by AJR
Oko, a character in the children's television show It's a Big Big World
ÖkoDAX, a German stock market indext
Orisha Oko, a spirit in the Yoruba religion
Yokota Air Base, a military air force airport in Tokyo, Japan

See also
List of Oko satellites
Okko (disambiguation)